Freedom is a town in Outagamie County, Wisconsin, United States. The population was 6,200 at the 2020 census. The unincorporated communities of Freedom and Murphy Corner are located in the town and the unincorporated community of Five Corners is located partially within the town.

History
The first non-native settler in the Town of Freedom was James Andrew Jackson, an African-American who arrived in 1830. Jackson was asked by town residents if they could name the town "Jackson" after him, but he wanted the town to be named Freedom because this was where he obtained his freedom.

The Town of Freedom was established on June 5, 1852, and was split off from the Town of Lansing. In doing so, Freedom took most of the town of Lansing's residents, its town seat, and all of its standing town officers. (The remaining town and land comprising Lansing was renamed the Town of Center in April 1853).

Geography
According to the United States Census Bureau, the town has a total area of 35.8 square miles (92.6 km2), all of it land.

Demographics

As of the census of 2020, there were 6,200 people, 2,143 households, and 1,451 families residing in the town. The population density was 173.2 people per square mile (107.6/km2). There were 1,859 housing units at an average density of 52.0 per square mile (20.1/km2).  The racial makeup of the town was 97.6% White, 0.50% Native American, 0.08% Asian, 0.06% Pacific Islander, 0.19% from other races, and 0.29% from two or more races. Hispanic or Latino of any race were 0.80% of the population.

There were 2,143 households, out of which 43.2% had children under the age of 18 living with them, 70.0% were married couples living together, 5.3% had a female householder with no husband present, and 20.8% were non-families. 15.6% of all households were made up of individuals, and 4.5% had someone living alone who was 65 years of age or older. The average household size was 2.87 and the average family size was 3.23.

In the town, the population was spread out, with 27.3% under the age of 18, 8.2% from 18 to 24, 34.5% from 25 to 44, 20.3% from 45 to 64, and 11.1% who were 65 years of age or older. The median age was 33 years. For every 100 females, there were 104.5 males. For every 100 females age 18 and over, there were 104.5 males.

The median income for a household in the town was $83,935, and the median income for a family was $60,587. Males had a median income of $37,423 versus $26,727 for females. The per capita income for the town was $22,462. About 1.5% of families and 2.5% of the population were below the poverty line, including 5.3% of those under age 18 and 1.3% of those age 65 or over.

Transportation
The unincorporated hamlet of Freedom is located at the intersections of county roads S and E and State Highway 55. The town is north of the Fox Valley, and southwest of the Green Bay, Wisconsin. These roads connect Freedom to many surrounding areas including,

Businesses
Kerrigan Brothers Winery, the first winery in Outagamie County, was founded in 2000. The Field of Scenes Drive-In Theater is one of only 10 active drive-in-theaters in Wisconsin.
 The local grocery store Freedom Foods was founded in 1988 by Larry Westenburg. B's Brew became the first coffee shop in Freedom in late 2018, located just across the street from St. Nicholas Catholic Church.

Media
The Freedom Pursuit is the community newspaper.

Images

Notable people
 Charles Clack, Wisconsin politician
 Cole Konrad, MMA fighter, first Bellator Heavyweight World Champion
 James Lennon, Wisconsin politician
 Garrett Lowney, 2000 Olympic bronze medalist in Greco-Roman Wrestling
 James McCann, Wisconsin politician

References

2020 census data apart from population numbers is only partially present. Remaining census data is from the 2000 and 2010 census information.

External links
Town of Freedom, Wisconsin website

Towns in Outagamie County, Wisconsin
Towns in Wisconsin
Appleton–Fox Cities metropolitan area